Koni Lui Wai Yee (born 3 September 1982 in Hong Kong) is a model and 2nd runner up at the Miss Hong Kong 2006 pageant. She represented Hong Kong at Miss International 2006 in Tokyo, Japan and Beijing, China. She received two awards, Most Beautiful Smile and the Miss Friendship award. She won four Miss Friendship titles (2001, 2002, 2004, and 2005). With her win, Hong Kong is tied with Japan as the only nations at Miss International to win more than four Miss Friendships and at any international pageant.

Prior to Miss Hong Kong 2006, Koni Lui had also competed in the 2001 Elite Look of the Year HK contest, finishing 2nd and winning the Photogenic prize (Miss Hong Kong 2005）

Lui played a pregnant woman who had a miscarriage in the horror film Womb Ghosts that was released on March 18, 2010.

Filmography

Television

Film

References

External links
 TVB Official Blog of Koni Lui
 
 Koni Lui at the Hong Kong Movie DataBase

 	 

|-
! colspan="3" style="background: #DAA520;" | Miss Hong Kong

1982 births
Living people
Hong Kong beauty pageant winners
TVB actors
Alumni of the Hong Kong University of Science and Technology
Miss International 2006 delegates